Avrohom Yitzchok Sorotzkin is a prolific writer and former Rosh Yeshiva of Telshe yeshiva. He currently delivers the most advanced Talmudic lecture at the Mesivta of Lakewood. Rabbi Sorotzkin is widely recognized as a Gadol and leader of American Orthodox Jewry and he is a member of the Moetzes Gedolei HaTorah (Council of Torah Sages).

Biography
Sorotzkin is the son of Rabbi Baruch Sorotzkin, a Rosh Yeshiva in Telshe Yeshiva whose position he inherited. Due to controversy concerning the leadership of the Telshe Yeshiva in Cleveland, Sorotzkin relocated to Lakewood, NJ. There he continues to teach students and publish his works.

Sorotzkin, in addition to having studied under his father, is also a student of Rabbi Berel Soloveitchik.

Sorotzkin is the son-in-law of the late Rabbi Yecheskel Grubner, Chief Rabbi of Detroit. Sorotzkin is also recognized world-wide as a lecturer and had delivered many keynote addresses and guest lectures.

Works
Rabbi Yitzchok Sorotzkin has authored over seventy volumes of seforim, almost all of which are named one of the following two titles (this list is incomplete):
 Rinas Yitzchok רנת יצחק (Commentaries to Torah (three separate editions), Neviim and Ketuvim (each book being a different volume), Commentary to the Siddur, Commentary to the Shabbat prayers, Commentary to Rosh Hashanna and Yom Kippur prayers)
 Gevuras Yitzchok גבורת יצחק (Commentaries to various Talmudic tractates, Pirkei Avos, Chumash, Laws of Teshuva, Laws of Torah study, Maimonides' Mishneh Torah, and on the holidays of Sukkos, Chanukah, Purim, and Shavuoth.)

References

External links
 Audio: Rav Yitzchok Sorotzkin On Purim
 Some Audio Recordings of Rabbi Sorotzkin's Sermons

Living people
American Orthodox rabbis
Year of birth missing (living people)
20th-century American rabbis
21st-century American Jews